Mount Beaupré is named after a member of the Sandford Fleming party of 1872. It is located in the Victoria Cross Ranges in Alberta.

See also
Mountains of Alberta

References

Beaupre
Alberta's Rockies